Gerritsz may refer to:

Quiringh Gerritsz. van Brekelenkam (1622–1669), Dutch Baroque genre painter
Jan Gerritsz van Bronckhorst (1603–1661), Dutch Golden Age painter and engraver
Benjamin Gerritsz Cuyp (1612–1652), Dutch Golden Age landscape painter
Gerrit Gerritsz Cuyp (1565–1644), Dutch Golden Age painter and stained glass cartoon draughtsman
Jacob Gerritsz. Cuyp (also spelt Cuijp) (1594–1652), portrait and landscape painter, best known for his portraits
Cornelis Gerritsz Decker (1618–1678), Dutch Golden Age landscape painter
Gerrit Gerritsz (1465–1495), early Netherlandish painter from the northern Low Countries in the Holy Roman Empire
Hessel Gerritsz (1581–1632), Dutch engraver, cartographer, and publisher
Jacob Gerritsz. Loef (1605–1683), Dutch Golden Age marine painter
Dirck Gerritsz Pomp (1544–1608), Dutch sailor of the 16th–17th century, and the first known Dutchman to visit China and Japan
Hendrik Gerritsz Pot (1580–1657), Dutch Golden Age painter, officer of the militia
Pieter Gerritsz van Roestraten (1630–1700), Dutch Golden Age painter of still lifes and genre scenes
Floris Gerritsz. van Schooten (1585–1656), Dutch painter of still life
Maarten Gerritsz Vries (1589–1647), 17th-century Dutch cartographer and explorer
Adriaan Gerritsz de Vrije (1570–1643), Dutch Golden Age glass painter

See also
Gerritsz Bay, the 4 km wide bay on the north coast of Anvers Island in the Palmer Archipelago, Antarctica
Gritz (disambiguation)